The Sergey Dyagilev is a Dmitriy Furmanov-class (project 302, BiFa129M) Soviet/Russian river cruise ship, cruising in the Volga – Neva basin. The ship was built by VEB Elbewerften Boizenburg/Roßlau at their shipyard in Boizenburg, East Germany, and entered service in 1983. The ship is named after Russian art critic, patron, ballet impresario and founder of the Ballets Russes Sergei Diaghilev.

Her home port is currently Rostov-on-Don. Captain of the Sergey Dyagilev (2011) is Jury Makaryev.

Features
The ship has two restaurants, two bars, two souvenir shops, conference hall, sauna and library.

See also
 List of river cruise ships

References

External links

Sergey Dyagilev under future name Vasiliy Kandinskiy (2014) (Project-302) at Orthodox

1983 ships
River cruise ships
Ships built in East Germany
Passenger ships of the Soviet Union
Passenger ships of Russia
Ships of Russia